The Global Fellowship of Confessing Anglicans (branded as GAFCON or Gafcon) is a global network of conservative Anglican churches that formed in 2008 in response to ongoing theological disputes in the worldwide Anglican Communion. Conservative Anglicans met in 2008 at the Global Anglican Future Conference, creating the Jerusalem Declaration and establishing the Fellowship of Confessing Anglicans (FCA), which was rebranded as GAFCON in 2017.

History

The Global Anglican Future Conference was held near Jerusalem in June 2008 at the initiative of theologically conservative African, Asian, Australian, South American, North American and European Anglican leaders who opposed the ordination of homosexuals and the blessing of same-sex unions by member churches of the Anglican Communion. The meeting came as the culmination of a series of controversies in the Anglican Communion that began in 2003 when the openly non-celibate gay bishop Gene Robinson was consecrated by the Episcopal Church USA. GAFCON was organised as a conservative alternative to the 2008 Lambeth Conference, which was boycotted by many traditionalists except most notably, Bishop Anis. Mouneer Anis the Presiding Bishop of Jerusalem and the Middle East (a conservative himself on matters of human sexuality), however publicly announced he would not be one of the traditionalists attending GAFCON 2008; his observation was that "the Global South must not be driven by an exclusively Northern agenda or Northern personalities."

The GAFCON Final Statement produced at the first conference recognises the Archbishop of Canterbury for his historic role in the Anglican Church but denies that his recognition is the cornerstone of Anglican identity. The statement also called for the formation of "A Fellowship of Confessing Anglicans."

GAFCON was instrumental in the formation of the Anglican Church in North America in 2009. The ACNA was formed as an alternative church structure for those disaffected by the official Anglican structures in the United States and Canada. The Anglican Church of the Southern Cone of America, which covers much of South America, is a key constituent of the GAFCON movement. The Anglican Diocese of Sydney, Australia, played an important role in forming the FCA and its Archbishop Peter Jensen was the FCA's first secretary.

On 6 July 2009, GAFCON was launched within the British Isles and by 2016 rebranded itself as GAFCON GB & Europe. Through this branch, the Anglican Network in Europe was created, and the Reformed Episcopal Church and Free Church of England have been members of GAFCON GB & Europe since 2008. In 2015, Rod Thomas (a member of the executive of AMiE) was consecrated the provincial episcopal visitor for conservative evangelical members of the Church of England.

On 3 September 2009, GAFCON's South African branch was established by the initiative of Bishop Bethlehem Nopece, of the Anglican Diocese of Port Elizabeth. It incorporates Anglicans from three denominations: the Anglican Church of Southern Africa, the Church of England in South Africa and the Traditional Anglican Communion.

GAFCON in New Zealand was launched in April 2016 in two conferences that took place in Auckland and Christchurch reuniting nearly 500 members from the entire country. Chairman Archbishop Eliud Wabukala from Kenya sent a message of support read at the conferences. Video greetings were also sent by Archbishop Foley Beach of the Anglican Church in North America, and Bishop Richard Condie of the Anglican Diocese of Tasmania and chairman of GAFCON Australia. Rev. Jay Behan became the chair of GAFCON New Zealand. The creation of GAFCON New Zealand was a result of the passing of Motion 30 by the Anglican Church of Aotearoa, New Zealand and Polynesia and the subsequent document "A Way Forward", proposing the blessing of same-sex marriages, presented at their General Synod in May 2014. The Church of Confessing Anglicans Aotearoa/New Zealand was established in 2019 with Behan as the inaugural bishop.

GAFCON helped to form the Diocese of the Southern Cross in 2022, a breakaway from the Anglican Church of Australia as a result of disagreements over same-sex marriage and other issues.

Organization
The Global Fellowship of Confessing Anglicans aims to extend the goals of the GAFCON conferences into a movement, to "preach the biblical gospel [...] all over the world" and "provide aid to [...] faithful Anglicans" disaffected from their original churches. The fellowship recognizes the Jerusalem Declaration, written at the 2008 GAFCON meeting, as a "contemporary rule." The fellowship is administered by a "Primates' Council" originally consisting of Primates from the African provinces of the Anglican Communion.

Member provinces

Non-provincial GAFCON branches

See also
 Anglican realignment
 Homosexuality and Anglicanism

References

External links
 Official website
 The Jerusalem Declaration
 Constructing the boundaries of Anglican orthodoxy: An analysis of the Global Anglican Future Conference (GAFCON) an article from the journal Religion on GAFCON and the evolution of FCA

Anglicanism
Anglican realignment
Anglican Church in North America
Schisms in Christianity